The Tadeusz Kościuszko Monument, also known as the Tadeusz Kościuszko Memorial and the Thaddeus Kosciuszko Memorial, is an outdoor sculpture by artist Kazimierz Chodziński depicting Tadeusz Kościuszko, installed in the median of East Solidarity Drive, near Chicago's Shedd Aquarium, in the U.S. state of Illinois. The statue was created in 1904, and was originally located in Humboldt Park.

See also
 1904 in art
 Commemoration of Tadeusz Kościuszko
 Kosciuszko Park (Chicago)
 List of things named after Tadeusz Kościuszko
 Tadeusz Kościuszko Monument, Kraków
 Tadeusz Kościuszko Monument, Warsaw

References

External links

 

1904 sculptures
Equestrian statues in Illinois
Monuments and memorials in Chicago
Chicago
Outdoor sculptures in Chicago
Sculptures of men in Illinois
Statues in Chicago